Henley is an unincorporated community in Klamath County, Oregon, United States.

The community is named after James T. Henley, who settled here in 1887 and operated a large ranch. He died in 1901.

Henley High School, Henley Middle School, and Henley Elementary are in Henley. All are part of the Klamath County School District.

References

Unincorporated communities in Klamath County, Oregon
Unincorporated communities in Oregon